Maria Dalva de Souza Figueiredo known as Dalva Figueiredo is a  Brazilian politician. She was the Governor of Amapá.

References

Living people
Year of birth missing (living people)
People from Amapá
21st-century Brazilian women politicians